"Two Out of Three Ain't Bad" is a power ballad performed by the American musician Meat Loaf. It is a track off his 1977 album Bat Out of Hell, written by Jim Steinman. It spent 23 weeks on the Billboard Hot 100, peaking at #11, and earned a million-selling Gold single from the RIAA, eventually being certified platinum. It remains his second-highest charting hit in the US, behind "I'd Do Anything for Love (But I Won't Do That)" (1993), and stands as one of his career signature tunes.

Background
It was the final song written for the album. In a 2003 interview for the VH1 Ultimate Albums series, Steinman recalled:

I remember Mimi Kennedy [a cast member of Jim's then-current musical Rhinegold] telling me, she said, you know, when I was probably complaining why no one liked my stuff and couldn't get a deal, she says, 'Well Steiny, your stuff is so complicated. Can't you write something simple?' And while she was saying that the oldies station was on the radio and it was playing that old Elvis song, 'I Want You, I Need,' whatever it was. 'I Want You, I Need You, I Love You', you know. I just started singing my own song but it was 'I Want You, I Need You, I Love You.' She said, 'Why don't you write something simple like that, "I want you, I need you, I love you"?' I said, 'Well I'll try.' I don't try to make them complicated. I remember going home and I tried so hard but the best I could do was: 'I want you, I need you but there ain't no way I'm ever gonna love you, don't be sad, 'cause two out of three ain't bad'. So it was still a twist but it was my closest to a simple song, and one Elvis could have done.

A music video was shot for the single and received significant airplay on television video programs of the period, four years before MTV's debut.

Two mixes were created for the song. In the album mix, timed around 5:27, one can hear prominent Moog synthesizer embellishments by session keyboardist Roger Powell. The single mix, timed around 3:50, downmixes the synthesizer considerably, in place of a much warmer and predominant string arrangement by Kenneth Ascher. This mix also edits out and removes the first lyrical bridge of the song which includes the line, "There ain't no Coupe de Ville hiding at the bottom of a Cracker Jack box", and does some overlapping, splicing and editing to seamlessly merge back into the second part of the lyrical bridge, starting with, "I can't lie, I can't tell you that I'm something I'm not". An additional edit in the last verse removes the lines, "And though I know I'll never get her out of my heart, she never loved me back, Ooh I know, well I remember how she left me on a stormy night, oh she kissed me and got out of our bed". Last, a song fade-out beginning in the middle of the ending chorus' second refrain is also featured, hence removing the full-circle lyrics of "Baby we can talk all night, but that ain't getting us nowhere", that both started and ended the song, in its full album-mix version.

The Japanese release changes the title of the song to use a percentage, translating it as "66% is good enough".

Reception
Cash Box said that the "vocals are emotionally rendered" and the "lyric is interesting."  Record World called it a "rambling but appealing single."

Charts and certifications

Meat Loaf version

Weekly charts

Year-end charts

Certifications

Julian Austin version

Personnel (original Meat Loaf version)
 Meat Loaf – lead vocals
 Todd Rundgren – guitar, backing vocals
 Kasim Sulton – bass guitar
 Roy Bittan – piano
 Roger Powell – synthesizer
 John "Willie" Wilcox – drums
 Rory Dodd – additional backing vocals
 Strings arranged and conducted by Kenneth Ascher

References

External links
 Lyrics of this song
 

1978 singles
Meat Loaf songs
1977 songs
Songs written by Jim Steinman
Epic Records singles
1970s ballads
Rock ballads
Bonnie Tyler songs
Julian Austin (musician) songs
Nitty Gritty Dirt Band songs
Song recordings produced by Todd Rundgren
Song recordings with Wall of Sound arrangements